Naomi Annie Hocking Messer (1889 – 17 March 1966), known as Anne Hocking and nicknamed "Mona," was an English crime writer, best remembered for her detective stories featuring Chief Superintendent William Austen.

Life and career 
The daughter of Joseph Hocking, niece of Silas Hocking and Salome Hocking and sister of Elizabeth Nisot and Joan Shill, all writers, Anne Hocking was a prolific mystery writer, author of more than 40 genre novels between 1930 and 1962. One of them (1940's The Wicked Flee) was made into a British crime film in 1957.

She was married first, in 1910, to Frederick William Dunlop, who died in August 1914 in Buckinghamshire. She married secondly, in 1918, to Henry R. Messer. She died at Battle Hospital in Reading, Berkshire in 1966.

Bibliography

Chief Superintendent William Austen Series 

 Old Mrs. Fitzgerald (1939). Serialised Weekly, Sunday Post (1939)
 The Wicked Flee (1940)
 Miss Milverton (1941) AKA Poison is a Bitter Brew (Doubleday 1942)
 One Shall Be Taken (1942)
 Nile Green AKA Death Loves a Shining Mark (1943)
 Six Green Bottles (1943)
 The Vultures Gather (1945)
 Death at the Wedding (1946)
 The Finishing Touch (1947) AKA Prussian Blue (Geoffrey Bles 1947)
 At "The Cedars" (1949)
 Death Disturbs Mr. Jefferson (1950)
 Mediterranean Murder AKA Killing Kin (1951)
 The Best Laid Plans (1952) (Doubleday 1950)
 There's Death in the Cup (1952)
 Death Among The Tulips (1953)
 The Evil That Men Do (1953)
 And No One Wept (1954)
 Poison in Paradise (1955)
 A Reason for Murder (1955)
 Murder at Mid-Day (1956)
 Relative Murder (1957)
 The Simple Way of Poison (1957)
 Epitaph for a Nurse AKA A Victim Must Be Found (1958)
 Poisoned Chalice (1959)
 To Cease Upon the Midnight (1959)
 The Thin-Spun Life (1960)
 Candidates for Murder (1961)
 He Had to Die (1962)
 Murder Cries Out (1968) (Finished by Evelyn Healey)

Other Crime Novels 

 Cat's Paw (1933)
 Death Duel (1933)
 Walk Into My Parlour (1934)
 The Hunt is Up (1934)
 Without the Option (1935)
 Stranglehold (1936)
 The House of En-dor (1936)
 As I Was Going to St. Ives (1937)
 What a Tangled Web (1937)
 Ill Deeds Done (1938)
 The Little Victims Play (1938)
 So Many Doors (1939)
 Deadly is the Evil Tongue (1940)
 Night's Candles (1941)

Crime Novels, signed by "Mona Messer" 

 A Castle for Sale (1930)
 Mouse Trap (1931)

Non Crime Novels, signed by "Mona Messer" 

 Eternal Compromise (1932)
 A Dinner of Herbs (1933)
 The End of the Lane (1933)
 Playing Providence (1934)
 Wife of Richard (1934)
 Cuckoo’s Brood (1935)
 Life Owes Me Something (1936)
 Tomorrow Also (1937)
 Marriage is Like That (1938)
 Stranger’s Vineyard (1939)
 The Gift of a Daughter (1940)

References
 John M. Reilly, Twentieth Century Crime and Mystery Writers, 2e édition, New York, St. Martin’s Press, 2007, p. 460-461.
 Jacques Baudou et Jean-Jacques Schleret, Le Vrai Visage du Masque, Volume 1, Paris, Futuropolis, 1984, p. 243.
 Anne Martinetti, Le Masque. Histoire d'une collection, Paris, Éditions Encrage, 1997, p. 77.
 Alan M. Kent, Pulp Methodism: The Lives & Literature of Silas, Joseph & Salome Hocking, Cornwall, Cornish Hillside Publications, 2002, chapter 6.

Notes

External links 
 
 http://www.philsp.com/homeville/CrFi/i0001.htm
 http://www.classiccrimefiction.com/anne-hocking.htm
 http://www.stopyourekillingme.com/H_Authors/Hocking_Anne.html

1889 births
1966 deaths
English crime fiction writers
English mystery writers
Women mystery writers
English women novelists
20th-century English novelists
20th-century English women writers
Writers from London
Date of birth missing
People from Thornton Heath